Meka Rangaiah Appa Rao shortly M. R. Appa Rao (21 March 1915 – 31 January 2003) was Vice Chancellor of Andhra University, Member of Andhra Pradesh Legislative Assembly, Minister in Government of Andhra Pradesh, Member of Rajya Sabha.

He was the son of Meka Venkatadri Appa Rao, a Zamindar (landlord), and was born in a Velama family in Nuzvid, Krishna district. His father was the Raja of Vuyyur, Nuzvid and an Indian freedom activist having held thousands of acres of land under his control. He was Chairman of Andhra Mahasabha in 1913 and translated and published the "Gita Govinda" in Telugu language. He was recipient of "Kala Prapoorna" from Andhra University in 1953.

He has entered politics and was elected to the Madras Legislative Assembly in 1952 Madras State legislative assembly election from Nuzvid constituency. He was elected to the Andhra Pradesh Legislative Assembly from Nuzvid constituency in 1955 (then Andhra State), 1962, 1967 and 1972 as a member of Indian National Congress. He held the portfolio of Minister of Cultural Affairs in the Government of Andhra Pradesh.

He held the position of Vice Chancellor of Andhra University for two terms between 13 December 1974 and 12 December 1980. He has written Prajaswamika Socialism Pranalikalu (1980) and Bharateeya Chitrakala (1987) in Telugu language and Land Development Banks in Andhra Pradesh (1981) and Round the World (1981) in English.

He was member of Rajya Sabha in Indian Parliament from 20 March 1981 to 2 April 1982.

He died on 31 January 2003. The University college of Acharya Nagarjuna University at Nuzvid was named after him as Dr. M. R. Appa Row Campus.

References

1915 births
2003 deaths
Rajya Sabha members from Andhra Pradesh
People from Krishna district
Academic staff of Andhra University
Members of the Andhra Pradesh Legislative Assembly
Telugu politicians
Indian National Congress politicians from Andhra Pradesh
Vice-Chancellors of the Andhra University
20th-century Indian politicians